Nyoma fuscosignata is a species of beetle in the family Cerambycidae. It was described by Breuning in 1948, originally under the genus Sophroniella. It is known from Ghana, the Ivory Coast, and the Democratic Republic of the Congo.

References

Desmiphorini
Beetles described in 1948